Mohammad Huraira (born 25 April 2002) is a Pakistani cricketer. He made his first-class debut on 20 October 2021, for Northern in the 2021–22 Quaid-e-Azam Trophy. Prior to his first-class debut, he was named in Pakistan's squad for the 2020 Under-19 Cricket World Cup.

In the tenth and final round of the 2021–22 Quaid-e-Azam Trophy, he scored his maiden double century in first-class cricket, before converting it into his maiden triple century. He became the second-youngest batter to score a triple century in a domestic first-class match in Pakistan. He made his Twenty20 debut on 20 February 2022, for Islamabad United in the 2022 Pakistan Super League.

References

External links
 

2002 births
Living people
Pakistani cricketers
Islamabad United cricketers
Cricketers from Sialkot